A bass recorder is a wind instrument in F3 that belongs to the family of recorders.

The bass recorder plays an octave lower than the alto or treble recorder. In the recorder family it stands in between the tenor recorder and C great-bass (or quart-bass) recorder.

Due to the length of the instrument, the lowest tone, F, requires a key. On modern instruments, keys may also be provided for low F, G, and G, and sometimes for C and C as well.

In the early 17th century, Michael Praetorius used the diminutive term "basset" (small bass) to describe this size of recorder as the lowest member of the "four-foot" consort, in which the instruments sound an octave higher than the corresponding human voices. Praetorius calls the next-lower instrument (bottom note B2) a "bass", and the instrument an octave lower than the basset (with bottom note F2) a Großbaß, or "large bass".

The bass is usually the lowest instrument of the recorder consort, but it may be used as an alto in "eight-foot" register in the so-called "great consort" or grand jeux, in which case two larger sizes of bass recorder take the lower parts and a tenor may be used as an optional descant.

References 
 
 
 
 

Footnotes

Baroque instruments
Early musical instruments
Internal fipple flutes
Recorders (musical instruments)